New World Development Company Limited (NWD), is a Hong Kong-based company focused on  property,  hotels, infrastructure and services and department stores. It was established on 29 May 1970 by Cheng Yu-tung. The company is publicly listed on the Stock Exchange of Hong Kong Limited (SEHK: 17) since 23 November 1972 and is a constituent stock of Hong Kong Hang Seng Index.

Over the last four decades, the group has also actively participated in various businesses in Mainland China and established itself as one of the largest foreign direct investors in the country. The group's existing investments in Mainland China has exceeded US$16.5 billion, spreading across four municipalities and over 19 provinces.

History

Launch and rapid growth 

The New World Development (NWD) Company Limited was established on 29 May 1970 to venture into property development. Dr Ho Sin Hang was elected Chairman of the company, while Dr. Cheng Yu-tung was appointed Director and General Manager. Chow Tai Fook Enterprises Limited was the company's largest shareholder. Cheng Tu Yung had bought large properties during the 1960s, and consolidated his real estate assets in NWD.

In October 1972, NWD (current ticker symbol: SEHK:17) was listed on the Hong Kong stock exchanges, raising over HK$193 million.

On 21 October 1986, Queen Elizabeth II officiated at the foundation stone laying ceremony of the HKCEC.

Reorganization 

In February 1992, New World Development (China) was set up. In October 1995, New World Infrastructure Limited (NWI) (Hong Kong stock code: 301) was formed to consolidate all of NWD's infrastructure projects in Hong Kong and Mainland China, and was listed on HKSE the same month. In April 1997, New World Services Limited (NWS) was established to consolidate all the services-related units within the group. In July 1999, New World China Land Limited (NWCL) (Hong Kong stock code: 917) was formed to consolidate all of NWD's property projects in Mainland China, and was listed on HKSE the same month.

In September 2000, the group acquired New World Insurance Services Limited. In September 2001, NWS acquired the entire issued share capital of Ngo Kee Construction Company Limited. In October 2002, Pacific Ports Company Limited (PPC) acquired the traditional infrastructure assets from NWI, and acquired NWS from NWD.

In January 2003, the reorganization of New World Group was completed. NWS Holdings Limited, after changing its name from Pacific Ports Company Limited, became the group's service flagship with diversified operations in service, infrastructure and ports in Hong Kong, Macau and Mainland China. All the group's shares were consolidated under the new name NWS Holdings Limited which began trading on The Stock Exchange of Hong Kong Limited.

In May 2005, NWD and Shanghai Industrial jointly invested US$3million into Shinhint Acoustic Link Holdings Ltd., a Hong Kong-based integrated manufacturing services provider for ODM/OEM production of electro-acoustic consumer products. Then it sold Riverside South, a luxury condominium project in New York City on land acquired from Donald Trump, for $1.8 billion – then the largest residential real estate transaction in the history of the city.

Recent developments 

In July 2007, New World Department Store China Limited (Hong Kong stock code: 0825) was listed on HKSE. The Guangzhou Dongxin Expressway, in which NWS Holdings held 40.8% equity interest, was officially opened on 31 December 2010. In August 2011, New World Group announced its full support to New World Harbour Race, a sporting event organised by the Hong Kong Amateur Swimming Association after a 33-year hiatus.

In December 2013, NWS Holdings Limited acquired equity shares in Beijing Capital International Airport to become its second largest shareholder. In April 2015, New World Development Company Limited and HIP Company Limited (HIP), a wholly owned subsidiary of The Abu Dhabi Investment Authority (ADIA), established a new joint venture company that own the Grand Hyatt Hong Kong, the Renaissance Harbour View and Hyatt Regency TST (the "Hotels"). The total consideration for the sale and transfer of the Hotels is HK$18,500 million, out of which approximately HK$10,082 million was received by NWD. In 2016, the company decided to shift its strategy towards the country's main cities and move away from second-tier agglomerations.

In November 2018, NWD launched the new healthcare brand Humansa. In December 2018, NWS Holdings bought in cash the entire issued capital of the Hong Kong insurer FTLife.

In September 2019, the group donated 3 million square feet of its farmland reserves towards building social housing.

Organization 

New World Development owns listed companies NWS Holdings and New World Department Store China. New World China Land Limited is wholly owned by New World Development. The company also owned former listed company New World Hotels (Holdings). Rosewood Hotel Group, an hotel management company, is a former subsidiary of NWD group.

New World Development and sister listed company Chow Tai Fook Jewellery Group are both majority owned by privately owned Chow Tai Fook (Holding).

New World Development Company Limited is one of the Hong Kong companies who have a large landbank. As at 31 December 2014, the group had a landbank of around 9.25 million sq ft, of which around 5.3 million sq ft was residential property. The group had a total of approximately 18.3 million sq ft of attributable agricultural land reserve pending for conversion.

Governance 

 Chairman: Henry Cheng (since 2012)
 Chief Executive: Adrian Cheng (since 2017)

Former Chairmen 

 Ho Sin-hang (1970–1982)
 Cheng Yu-tung (1982–2012)

Former Chief Executives 
This position was formerly known as Managing Director (until 2012) and General Manager (until 2020)

 Cheng Yu-tung (1970–1989)
 Henry Cheng (1989–2012)
 Adrian Cheng and Chen Guanzhan (2012–2017)

Controversies

Hung Hom Peninsula

The Hung Hom Peninsula was sold for a below-market land premium of HK$864 million to New World Development, who subsequently sold off half share to Sun Hung Kai Properties. In 2004, the consortium announced the demolition of these buildings to make way for luxury apartments, to be faced with huge popular outcry about the needless destruction of "perfectly good buildings" to satisfy "corporate greed". In an unprecedented about-turn, the developers withdrew the plan on 10 December 2004.

Leung Chin-man

In 2008, New World was the subject of controversy when it announced it had hired former Permanent Secretary for Housing, Planning and Lands Leung Chin-man as deputy managing director and executive director of its China subsidiary, New World China Land Ltd. The Secretary for the Civil Service Denise Yue Chung-yee, signed off on the approval for him to take up the job within three years of leaving, failing to take into account the appearance of conflict of interest resulting from the Hung Hom Peninsula affair. New World argued that they hired Leung in good faith, after the government had given clearance. New World announced in the early hours of 16 August that the parties had agreed to rescind the contract.

Avenue of Stars

The company has managed the  Avenue of Stars for 11 years, and its contract is due to expire. It was announced that the  Leisure and Cultural Services Department of the Hong Kong government would redevelop and expand the avenue jointly with the company. The Hong Kong government declared that the enhancement project would contain limited commercial appeal, and no luxury shops or high-end restaurants would be added. The walkway, very popular with tourists, was closed off for three years while the expansion was undertaken.

The decision to award the contract for the redevelopment to the company without putting it out to tender, on the justification that the project was non-profit, sparked controversy locally. Residents' groups and other development companies owning properties adjacent to the walk expressed discontent, whilst the LCSD claimed that consultations with the local district council had been favourable. In an apparent attempt to de-fuse the public furore at the apparent collusion between government and big business, the government promised a public consultation.

See also
 New World Centre
 New World First Bus
 New World First Ferry
 Citybus (Hong Kong)
 New World Telecommunications
 K11 (Hong Kong)
 List of companies in Hong Kong

References

External links
 

 

 
Conglomerate companies of Hong Kong
Land developers of Hong Kong
Conglomerate companies established in 1970
1970 establishments in Hong Kong
Companies listed on the Hong Kong Stock Exchange
Companies in the Hang Seng Index
Family-owned companies of Hong Kong